Ángel Bastos Teijeira (born 3 May 1992) is a Spanish footballer who plays for CF Rayo Majadahonda as a right back.

Football career
Bastos was born in Mos, Pontevedra, Spain, and started his career with Porriño Industrial FC. In July 2013 he joined Tercera División side CD Choco, being an ever-present figure as his side finished sixth.

On 5 July 2014, Bastos moved to Coruxo FC in Segunda División B. Again being a regular starter, he signed for fellow league team Cultural Leonesa on 20 June 2016.

Bastos appeared in all league matches of the 2016–17 season, scoring two goals as his side achieved promotion to Segunda División as champions. He made his professional debut on 26 August 2017, starting in a 2–1 home win against CA Osasuna.

On 21 June 2018, after suffering relegation, Bastos signed for CF Reus Deportiu still in the second division. The following January, he terminated his contract with the Catalans due to the club's poor financial situation overall.

On 28 January 2019, Bastos moved to fellow second division side Extremadura UD.

Honours
Cultural Leonesa
Segunda División B: 2016–17

References

External links

1992 births
Living people
People from Vigo (comarca)
Sportspeople from the Province of Pontevedra
Footballers from Galicia (Spain)
Spanish footballers
Association football defenders
Segunda División players
Segunda División B players
Tercera División players
Divisiones Regionales de Fútbol players
Coruxo FC players
Cultural Leonesa footballers
CF Reus Deportiu players
Extremadura UD footballers
CF Rayo Majadahonda players
Liga I players
FC Hermannstadt players
Spanish expatriate footballers
Expatriate footballers in Romania
Spanish expatriate sportspeople in Romania